Mercedes-Benz has sold a number of automobiles with the "350" model name:
 1972 R107
 1972 350SL
 1990–1991 W126
 1990–1991 350SDL Turbo
 1991 350SD Turbo
 1994–1995 W140
 1994–1995 S350 Turbo Diesel 
 2005–2013 W221
 2005–2010 S350 V-6 Gasoline 
 2010–2013 S350 BlueEfficiency V-6 Gasoline with direct-injection 
 2009 S350 CDI BlueEfficiency V-6 Diesel 
 2010–2013 S350 BlueTEC V-6 Clean Diesel 

350